The Société du parler français au Canada (SPFC) ("French Speech in Canada Society") was a learned society that endeavoured to study the French language spoken in Canada in the course of the 20th century. Founded on February 18, 1902 by Adjutor Rivard and Stanislas-Alfred Lortie, two Université Laval professors, it made important contributions to lexicography in Quebec and Canada.

The SPFC ceased to exist in the 1960s. In 2002, the Université Laval, Université du Québec à Chicoutimi and Université de Sherbrooke marked the SPFC's 100th anniversary of foundation with a colloquium held at the Musée de la civilisation and presided by French linguist Bernard Quemada. The history of the SPFC was the object of a book by Quebec linguist Louis Mercier.

Founding members 
The 24 founding members of the SPFC included eight Université Laval professors and nine members of the catholic clergy:

Studies 
At its foundation, the SPFC gave itself a program of studies which was published in its first bulletin:

 The study of French philology, and particularly the study of the French language in Canada in its history, its character and its condition of existence;
 The examination of the dangers threatening the French speech in Canada: the influence of the milieu, the habitual and necessary contact with foreign idioms, the gradual deformation of a popular language left to itself, the tendencies to decay of modern literature, commerce and industry, and a too pronounced taste for old forms;
 The search for the best means to defend the language against these various dangers, to restitute what it has lost, and to restore its already deformed expressions, while preserving its special character;
 The work needed to make the French spoken in Canada a language answering at the same time to the natural progress of the idiom, the respect of tradition, the requirements of new social conditions, and the genius of the French language (génie de la langue française);
 The publication and propagation of works, studies and bulletins to this goal.

Activities 

The SPFC published a bulletin from its foundation up until 1918 and set up the first two of three Congresses on the French language in Canada (1912, 1937 and 1952).

In 1930, the SPFC published the Glossaire du parler français au Canada, the result of some thirty years of research. The glossary is still a reference today among researchers.

Presidents 
The following persons held the presidency of the SPFC:

Notes

References 
 SLMC. "(1930) Glossaire du parler français au Canada. Société du parler français au Canada", in the Site for Language Management in Canada, 2006

 In French
 LexiQué. "La Société du parler français au Canada (1902-1962)", in the site of the Laboratoire de lexicologie et lexicographie québécoises, June 6, 2007
 Verreault, Claude. "Adjutor Rivard (1868-1945)", in the site of the Laboratoire de lexicologie et lexicographie québécoises, June 6, 2007
 Verreault, Claude, Louis Mercier and Thomas Lavoie, ed. (2006). 1902-2002, la Société du parler français au Canada cent ans après sa fondation : mise en valeur d'un patrimoine culturel, Sainte-Foy: Presses de l'Université Laval, 242 p.  (preview)
 Mercier, Louis (2002). La Société du parler français au Canada et la mise en valeur du patrimoine linguistique québécois (1902-1962) : histoire de son enquête et genèse de son glossaire, Québec : Presses de l'Université Laval, 507 p.  (preview)
 Baudrillart, Alfred (1927). Vingt-cinquième anniversaire de la Société du Parler français au Canada : Discours prononcé à Québec, le 28 avril 1927, Paris: Firmin-Didot
 SPFC. Glossaire du parler français au Canada, Québec: l'Action sociale, 1930, 709 p. (online: PDF, HTML)
 Maheux, Arthur. "L'oeuvre de la société du parler français au Canada de 1902 à 1927", in Le Canada-français, Québec, vol. 14, no. 9 (May 1927), p. 608-621
 Rivard, Adjutor (1914). Études sur les parlers de France au Canada, Québec: J.-P. Garneau, 280 p. (online)
 SPFC. Bulletin du parler français au Canada (1902–1918) (online: vol. 2 to 16)
 SPFC (1906). Société du parler français au Canada, fondée le 18 février 1902 : statuts (adoptés le 22 mars 1906), Québec: Société du parler français au Canada, 15 p.
 SPFC (1902). Société du parler français au Canada : plan d'études, méthode de travail, méthode d'observation, Québec: Société du parler français au Canada], 24 p.

Quebec French
Learned societies of Canada
Organizations based in Quebec